Magonsæte was a minor sub-kingdom of the greater Anglo-Saxon kingdom of Mercia, thought to be coterminous with the Diocese of Hereford.

The British territory of Pengwern was conquered by Oswiu of Northumbria in 656, while he was overlord of the Mercians. Western Pengwern was then occupied by Anglian groups. One group based itself at the old Roman town of Magnae or (Old Welsh) Cair Magon, modern Kenchester near Hereford.

The sub-kingdom of the Western Hecani existed in the late 7th and early 8th centuries, of which three rulers are known: Merewalh, Mildfrith, and Merchelm. By the later 8th century, the region would seem to have been reincorporated into Mercia, perhaps as Westerna, becoming known as the Magonsæte by the 9th century.

Smaller sub-tribes of the Magonsæte included the Temersæte near Hereford and the Hahlsæte near Ludlow.

See also
Westerne
Archenfield

References

The Origins and Growth of Hereford, Archaeology Data Service. Retrieved 25 September 2006.

History of Herefordshire
History of Shropshire
Peoples of Anglo-Saxon Mercia
Sub-kingdoms of Mercia
Petty kingdoms of England